Carol Antonio Altamirano (born 13 December 1963) is a Mexican politician and lawyer affiliated with the PRD. He currently serves as Deputy of the LXII Legislature of the Mexican Congress representing Oaxaca.

References

1963 births
Living people
Politicians from Oaxaca
Party of the Democratic Revolution politicians
21st-century Mexican politicians
Universidad Autónoma Metropolitana alumni
Municipal presidents in Oaxaca
Members of the Congress of Oaxaca
Deputies of the LXII Legislature of Mexico
Members of the Chamber of Deputies (Mexico) for Oaxaca